Two warships of Sweden have been named Sälen, after Sälen in the Dalarna of Svealand:

 , a  launched in 1918 and stricken in 1943.
 , a  launched in 1954 and stricken in 1980.

Swedish Navy ship names